Thea Astley (born March 8, 2000) is a Filipino singer, songwriter, recording artist, actress, host, television personality, dancer, voice-over artist, and podcaster. She is the second season runner-up of singing competition The Clash.

As a contract artist under GMA Network's talent agency Sparkle, Astley is currently serving as the mainstay and voice-over of the variety show All-Out Sundays. She performed several theme songs and soundtracks for GMA dramas including Magpakailanman, First Yaya (and its continuation First Lady), The World Between Us, Nakarehas na Puso, and Start-Up PH.

Performances

Discography

Filmography

References

External links 
 
 Sparkle GMA Artist Center profile

2000 births
Living people
Filipino musical theatre actresses
Ateneo de Manila University alumni
21st-century Filipino singers
21st-century Filipino women singers
Participants in Philippine reality television series
GMA Network personalities
GMA Music artists
Filipino television personalities
Filipino women television presenters
Filipino television variety show hosts
Filipino podcasters